The Embassy of Sweden in London is the diplomatic mission of Sweden in the United Kingdom. The Swedish embassy is located in Marylebone, London, and represents the Swedish government in the United Kingdom.

Buildings

Chancery
In 1907, the Swedish legation in London moved into rented premises at 73 Portland Place. It was used both as chancery and as ambassadorial residence. In 1921, the townhouse at 27 Portland Place was purchased and a 999-year lease with the English landowner Howard de Walden was agreed. After the Second World War, the embassy found itself increasingly in need of space and the neighbouring property 29 Portland Place was therefore rented. The two properties were connected in a number of places. The lease on No. 29 was terminated in the early 1970s.

Between 1970 and 1983, the chancery was located at 23 North Row in Mayfair. Since 1983, the chancery building is located at 11 Montagu Square in Marylebone, just down the road from the embassy of Switzerland. Sweden also maintains a Trade Council at 259-269 Old Marylebone Road, Marylebone.

Residence
The ambassadorial residence is located at 27 Portland Place since 1921. It has been used as chancery and as residence but since 1983 it has been used solely as a residence.

Heads of Mission

Gallery

References

External links

 
 

Sweden
Diplomatic missions of Sweden
Sweden–United Kingdom relations
Buildings and structures in the City of Westminster
Marylebone